Puma Wayin (Quechua puma cougar, puma, Ancash Quechua wayi house, "cougar house", -n a suffix, also spelled Puma Huain) is a mountain in the Andes of Peru which reaches a height of approximately . It is located in the Huánuco Region, Huamalíes Province, Singa District.

References 

Mountains of Peru
Mountains of Huánuco Region